The New York State School for the Deaf (NYSSD) was founded in Rome, New York in 1874 by Alphonso Johnson, a graduate and former teacher of the NY Institution for the Deaf. The school now operates under the New York State Board of Regents.

History
Alphonso Johnson, a deaf graduate of the New York Institution for the Deaf and former teacher there founded a deaf school in Rome, New York in 1874 with the assistance of Rev. Thomas Gallaudet.  The school opened in 1875 with four pupils, with Johnson as principal and teacher.  The next year, the school began operating as the Central New York Institution for Deaf-Mutes.  Within three years, attendance rose to 100 and more buildings began construction.

In 1887, the New York State Legislature appropriated funds for several buildings, including Gallaudet Hall, as it was later named.  In 1931 the school became the Central New York School for the Deaf.  In 1963, by act of the Legislature, the school became part of the New York State Education Department and underwent a further name change to  New York State School for the Deaf.  Multimillion-dollar appropriations in the 1960s resulted in considerable expansion, with the campus now occupying 17 acres.

Fred L. Sparks of Gaffney, South Carolina became the superintendent in 1950.

Organization
Formerly a corporation, the school is a state operated agency and is now a part of the New York State Education Department and the New York State Board of Regents.  It is governed by Title VI Special Schools and Instruction, article 88 of the NY State Code.

Current enrollment is 65 students with 20 faculty.  Residential dorms are available for students who wish to live on campus.

Educational program

Academic study

NYSSD has programs for elementary education, middle school, high school, college prep, career prep and vocational education (BOCES), daily living skills, and fine arts; and also has a deaf infant program.

Athletics

NYSSD maintains sports programs in softball, track, and soccer.  The school mascot is the Trojans, and the colors are green and gold.

There are interscholastic teams in boys' basketball, soccer, and track; and girls' soccer, basketball and softball. NYSSD belongs to several conferences, the New York State Public High School Athletic Association (NYSPHSAA), the Eastern States Deaf Athletic Association (ESDAA), and the public school North Country Athletic Conference (NCAC).

References

Schools for the deaf in the United States
Educational institutions established in 1874
Schools in Oneida County, New York
Deaf studies
1874 establishments in New York (state)
Public boarding schools in the United States
Boarding schools in New York (state)